Benno Teschke (born 1967 in Osnabrück, West Germany) is a German international relations theorist. He is professor of International Relations at the University of Sussex. Teschke's scholarship is a contribution to Marxist international relations theory, specifically in the Political Marxism tendency. He obtained his PhD from the London School of Economics in 1999, with a thesis titled The making of the Westphalian state-system: Social property relations, geopolitics and the myth of 1648.

References

Bibliography 
 Teschke, Benno, "The Myth of 1648: Class, Geopolitics and the Making of Modern International Relations", Verso, London, 2003.

External links 
 Academic profile
 Political Marxism and the Social Sciences a platform for research on political marxism at the University of Sussex

Simultaneous Winner

1967 births
German political scientists
20th-century German historians
International relations scholars
Deutscher Memorial Prize winners
Academics of the University of Sussex
German expatriates in the United Kingdom
Writers from Osnabrück
Living people
German male non-fiction writers